Leo is a 2012 Kenyan movie directed by Jinna Mutune.

Synopsis 
A young Masai boy who is eager to become a super hero despite the challenges he faces in life.

References 

Films set in Kenya
Kenyan drama films
2012 films